United Nations Security Council resolution 708, adopted unanimously on 28 August 1991, after noting the death of International Court of Justice (ICJ) President Taslim Olawale Elias on 14 August 1991, the council decided that elections to the vacancy on the ICJ would take place on 5 December 1991 at the Security Council and at the General Assembly's 46th session.

Elias was a member of the court since 1976, and was its vice-president between 1979 and 1981 and its president from 1981 to 1985. His term of office was due to expire in February 1994.

See also
 Judges of the International Court of Justice
 List of United Nations Security Council Resolutions 701 to 800 (1991–1993)

References

External links
 
Text of the Resolution at undocs.org

 0708
 0708
August 1991 events